East Bengal ( Purbô Bangla/Purbôbongo) was a non-contiguous province of the Dominion of Pakistan. Geographically part of the Bengal region, East Bengal existed from 1947 until 1955, when it was renamed East Pakistan. Today, the area is an independent country, Bangladesh. With its coastline on the Bay of Bengal, it bordered India and Myanmar. It was located close to, but did not share a border with, Nepal, Tibet, the Kingdom of Bhutan and the Kingdom of Sikkim. Its capital was Dacca, now known as Dhaka.

The Partition of India, which divided Bengal along religious lines, established the borders of Muslim majority East Bengal. The province existed during the reign of two monarchs, including George VI and Elizabeth II; and three Governors-General, including Muhammad Ali Jinnah, Khawaja Nazimuddin and Ghulam Muhammad. Its provincial governors included a British administrator and several Pakistani statesmen. Its chief ministership was held by leading Bengali politicians.

East Bengal was the most populous and cosmopolitan province in the dominion. It was a hub of political movements, including the Bengali Language Movement and pro-democracy groups. It was dissolved in 1955 and replaced by East Pakistan during the One Unit scheme implemented by Prime Minister Mohammad Ali of Bogra.

The provincial legislature was the East Bengal Legislative Assembly.

History

Mandates for partition

Between 1905 and 1911, a province called Eastern Bengal and Assam existed in the region as part of the British Indian Empire. The All India Muslim League was founded in the British province in 1906.

The All India Muslim League adopted the Lahore Resolution in 1940 which envisaged the creation of sovereign states in the Muslim majority areas of eastern and northwestern British India. The League won elections in Bengal in 1946, receiving its largest mandate in the province.

In May 1946, Rohingya Muslim leaders from met with Muhammad Ali Jinnah, and asked for a formal annexation of the Mayu region. Two months later, the North Arakan Muslim League also asked Jinnah to annex the region. Jinnah refused, saying he could not interfere with Burma's internal matters. Proposals were also made to the Burmese government but they were rejected.

The District of Sylhet in Assam Province also voted to reunite with the rest of East Bengal, and the Muslim League's campaign played a great role in facilitating this. A plebiscite was held which resulted in joining Pakistan. However, a large part of Sylhet's Karimganj subdivision was barred due to Abdul Matlib Mazumdar's delegation. The Chittagong Hill Tracts, which had a 97% non-Muslim population (mostly Buddhist), was awarded to Pakistan by the Boundary Commission due to it being inaccessible to India and to provide a substantial rural buffer to support Chittagong, a major city and port; advocates for Pakistan forcefully argued to the Bengal Boundary Commission that the only approach was through Chittagong.

As a result of these mandates, the Mountbatten Plan and Radcliffe Line established East Bengal as a province of the newly formed Dominion of Pakistan in August 1947.

Nazimuddin ministry

Sir Khawaja Nazimuddin, a former Prime Minister of Bengal, was the first Chief Minister of East Bengal after partition. Nazimuddin was a senior leader of the Muslim League and a close confidante of Pakistan's founder Muhammad Ali Jinnah. Sir Frederick Chalmers Bourne was the first Governor of East Bengal. Partition resulted in making many Hindus to leave East Bengal while Muslims from different parts of the Indian subcontinent migrated to East Bengal. The East-West Bengal border did not see as much violence as seen in the Punjab border between North India and Pakistan.

Jinnah made his sole visit to East Bengal as governor general in 1948. During a speech to students in Dhaka University, he resisted demands to make Bengali a federal language. His refusal sparked fierce protests among East Bengalis who comprised the majority of Pakistan's population. The proposal for Urdu as the sole national language met with strong opposition in East Bengal, where Urdu considered rather alien, especially in light in Bengali's rich literary heritage.

When Jinnah died in 1948, Nazimuddin became the Governor General of Pakistan.

Amin ministry

The conservative Muslim League leader Nurul Amin succeeded Nazimuddin as Chief Minister. According to some sources, Amin had strained relations with the federal government, including Prime Minister Liaquat Ali Khan and Governor General Khawaja Nazimuddin. Historians have noted that Amin's government was not strong enough to administer the provincial state; it was completely under the control of the central government of Nazimuddin. His government did not enjoy enough power and lacked vision, imagination, and initiatives.

In 1949, Maulana Bhashani led left-wing elements in the Muslim League to break away and form the Awami Muslim League. The new party was joined by Huseyn Shaheed Suhrawardy, a former Prime Minister of British Bengal. The new party later dropped the word Muslim, fashioned itself as secular and courted votes from East Bengal's large non-Muslim minorities.

The language movement reached a climax in 1952. During the unrest, the police shot dead four student activists. This raised more opposition in the region to the Muslim League. Leading politicians in West and East Pakistan called for Amin's resignation. In subsequent provincial elections, Amin lost his seat in the legislative assembly.

Huq ministry

In the 1954, the United Front coalition resoundingly defeated the Muslim League with a landslide majority. The coalition included the Awami League, the Krishak Praja Party, the Democracy Party and Nizam-e-Islam. The esteemed lawyer A. K. Fazlul Huq, popularly known as the Sher-e-Bangla (Lion of Bengal), became Chief Minister. Huq established the Bangla Academy and called for greater provincial autonomy. He wanted the federal government's responsibilities limited to only foreign affairs and defense.

King Saud of Saudi Arabia sent a plane to bring Huq to a meeting with the monarch. The New York Times published an article claiming Huq wanted independence for East Bengal. While visiting Calcutta and New Delhi, Huq was received by Indian leaders. Barely a few months into office, Huq was dismissed by Governor General Ghulam Muhammad due to allegations against of Huq of inciting secession.

Sarkar ministry
After Governor General's rule was withdrawn in 1954, Abu Hussain Sarkar briefly served as chief minister, before Governor General's rule was again imposed. He started the construction of Central Shaheed Minar.

Khan ministry
Governor General's rule was withdrawn in June 1955. Ataur Rahman Khan of the Krishak Sramik Party was the last Chief Minister. His government declared 21 February, the anniversary of the language movement, a public holiday. He later resigned on 30 August 1956 over inflation of food grains and subsequent food shortages.

One Unit
As part of the reforms and reorganization policies of Prime Minister of Pakistan Mohammad Ali of Bogra, East Bengal was renamed as East Pakistan on 14 October 1955.

Federal law and East Bengal

East Bengal existed when Pakistan did not have a written constitution. Instead, the Pakistani courts relied on English common law and the Objectives Resolution.

Constitutional Coup

In 1953, Prime Minister Khawaja Nazimuddin's government was dismissed by Governor General Ghulam Muhammad, in spite of enjoying the confidence of a majority in the Constituent Assembly of Pakistan. The governor general later dissolved the constituent assembly itself.
In the case of Federation of Pakistan v. Maulvi Tamizuddin Khan, the speaker of the dissolved constituent assembly challenged the governor general's decision in the Sindh High Court. The case proceeded to the apex court- the Federal Court of Pakistan- where Justice M. Munir ruled in favour of the governor general. Justice A. R. Cornelius expressed dissent and supported Speaker Khan. The dismissal of the prime minister and assembly was one of the first major blows to democracy and the rule of law in the Pakistani union.

Reform demands
Begum Shaista Suhrawardy Ikramullah called for Pakistan's constituent assembly to convene in Dacca as East Bengal was home to the majority of Pakistan's population.

Governors and chief ministers

Economy, culture, religion and military

Orient Airways, owned by an East Bengal-based industrialist, launched the first flights between Karachi and Dacca. The airline later evolved into Pakistan International Airlines.

The Chittagong Tea Auction was established in 1949.

As a result of the Bengali Language Movement, East Bengal was a center of Bengali cultural activities.

The University of Dacca was hotbed of political thought.

The East Bengal Regiment was formed on 15 February 1948 following Pakistan's independence and transition from post British rule. The infantry of the new Pakistan Army was made up exclusively of men from the western part of the country. It was consequently necessary to raise a regiment in the east. A total of eight battalions were raised.

Religion

East Bengal (present-day-Bangladesh) had a population of 19 million people in the year 1800 A.D, of which 10.716 million people were followers of Hinduism representing a majority of about 56.4% of the region's population, while 7.961 million adheres to the Muslim faith, constituting 41.9% of the region's population as 2nd largest community. The smaller number of 3.23 lakh people followed Buddhism, Animism and Christianity, together presenting around 1.7% of the region's population.

Bangladesh's capital Dhaka city name is said to have been derived from Dhakeshwari Maa (“The Hindu Goddess Durga”), whose shrine is located in the western part of the city. In Bangladesh, there's exist a blending culture of Hindu, Muslim, Buddhist, folk religion, deities and practices. Worship exchanges takes place at temples and mosques and religious folk music gatherings (especially at Vaishnavite gatherings and among Muslim Sufis). Folk deities recognized by both Hindus and Muslim have included Shitala, the goddess of small pox, Oladevi, goddess of cholera, Manasa, goddess of snakes and are worshipped by Hindus and Muslims of Bangladesh both alike.

Present

As of 21st century, the present region of East Bengal exists in form of sovereign Bangladesh today and is now an Islamic country both demographically and constitutionally as the country holds fourth-largest Muslim population in the globe and Islam is the official state religion of Bangladesh by Article (2A). The population of Bangladesh is 165.2 million as per 2022 census report, of which majority of 150.49 million people (91.1 percent of Bangladeshis) follow Islam, Hinduism is followed by 13.05 million people (7.9 percent of population) as second-largest religion, Buddhism being third-most followed religion and is followed by 9.91 Lakh people (0.6 percent of population), Christianity is followed by 4.95 lakh people (0.3 percent of the population) and tiny micro-scopic minority of 1.65 lakh people (0.1 percent of population) follow other religions most being tribal and Animists.

See also
 Provinces of Pakistan
 East Pakistan

Notes

References

 
Former subdivisions of Pakistan
1947 establishments in East Pakistan
1955 disestablishments in Pakistan